Hemis, also spelled Hamis, is a village in the Leh district of Ladakh, India. It is located in the Kharu tehsil, 40 km southeast of Leh town on the Leh-Manali Highway and under-construction Bhanupli–Leh line.

Hemis is well known for the Hemis monastery that was established in 1672 AD by king Sengge Namgyal. The village hosts a colorful festival held in July. It is close to the Hemis National Park, an area that is home to the endangered snow leopard. The national park was created in 1981.

Hemis Monastery 

Hemis Monastery already existed before the 11th century. Nāropā, the pupil of the yogi Tilopa, and teacher of the translator Marpa was connected with this monastery. A  translation of Naropa's biography has been found in Hemis monastery. It has been translated by A. Grünwedel (Năro und Tilo, Festschrift Ernst Kuhn, München 1916). In 1887, Nicolas Notovitch wrote a book claiming to be the translation of a document held in Hemis Library that states Jesus had spent his unknown years at the Hemis monastery.

Other attractions 
 Hemis National Park: Inhabited by a number of snow leopards, Hemis National Park is located at an elevation of around 3000 – 6000 m and is spread across more than 4000 km2. Apart from being a home to many rare and endangered species of flora and fauna, this National Park is the second-largest protected area after Nanda Devi Biosphere Reserve. With no motor vehicles allowed in or near the park, you can trek your way up to this place during the months of June to October.
 Gotsang Gompa: A tranquil and quiet place, Gotsang Gompa is located close to the Hemis Monastery. A roadless Buddhist Center, Gotsang Gompa has two main temple buildings and is reachable via a hiking trail from Hemis Gompa.
 Stakna Monastery: Often referred to as Stakna Gompa (literal translation: Tiger's Nose), this monastery is perched atop a hill shaped like a tiger's nose, thus the name. Located along the banks of the Indus River, this monastery is situated at a distance of 25 km from Leh city's centre.

Demographics
According to the 2011 census of India, Hemis has 24 households. The effective literacy rate (i.e. the literacy rate of population excluding children aged 6 and below) is 90.63%.

References

Villages in Kharu tehsil
Ladakh
Geography of Ladakh